New Amsterdam was the Dutch colonial settlement that later became New York City.

New Amsterdam or Nieuw Amsterdam may also refer to:

Places
New Amsterdam, Indiana, a town in Indiana, U.S.
New Amsterdam, Guyana, a town in East Berbice-Corentyne Region, Guyana
New Amsterdam Public Hospital, the hospital in New Amsterdam, Guyana
New Amsterdam, Wisconsin, an unincorporated community in Wisconsin, U.S.
New Amsterdam, New Holland, a former Dutch colonial settlement in Brazil
New Amsterdam Historic District, a section of Detroit, Michigan, U.S.
Nieuw Amsterdam, Suriname, the capital of the Commewijne District, Suriname
Nieuw-Amsterdam, Netherlands, a village in Emmen, Drenthe, Netherlands
Buffalo, New York or New Amsterdam, New York, U.S.
Île Amsterdam or Nieuw Amsterdam, an island in the Indian Ocean

Entertainment
New Amsterdam (2008 TV series), a 2008 fantasy police procedural television series
New Amsterdam (2018 TV series), a 2018 medical drama television series
"New Amsterdam" (Mad Men), a first season episode of Mad Men
New Amsterdam: Live at Heineken Music Hall February 4–6, 2003, an album by Counting Crows
"New Amsterdam", a song by Elvis Costello from Get Happy!!
"New Amsterdam", a song by Travis from The Boy With No Name
"New Amsterdam", a song by Ilse DeLange from Gravel & Dust
New Amsterdam, a 2007 novel by Elizabeth Bear
New Amsterdam Records, a label for New York composers and performers
New Amsterdam Theatre, a theater in New York City
The New Amsterdams, an American rock band

Ships
Nieuw Amsterdam (sailing ship), a 17th century Dutch warship commanded by Anthony van Diemen
SS Nieuw Amsterdam (1905), an ocean liner in service 1905–1932
SS Nieuw Amsterdam (1937), an ocean liner in service 1938–1974
MS Nieuw Amsterdam (1982), a cruise ship in service 1984–2000
MS Nieuw Amsterdam (2009), a cruise ship that entered service in 2010

Other uses
 New Amsterdam FC, a soccer team from Bronx, New York City
 New Amsterdam Spirits, an American brand of gin and vodka owned by E & J Gallo Winery

See also
Nieuw Amsterdam railway station
Amsterdam Nieuw-West